Dwight McGlothern is an American football cornerback for the Arkansas Razorbacks. He previously played for the LSU Tigers.

High school career
McGlothern attended Klein Oak High School in Klein, Texas. He played wide receiver and cornerback in high school. During his career, he had 2,593 receiving yards with 34 touchdowns on offense and 15 interceptions on defense. McGlothern played in the 2020 All-American Bowl. A four star prospect, committed to Louisiana State University (LSU) to play college football.

College career
As a true freshman at LSU in 2020, McGlothern played in seven games and had nine tackles. As a junior in 2021, he started six of 10 games, recording 32 tackles and one interception returned for a touchdown. McGlothern transferred to the University of Arkansas in 2022 and was a starter his first year. He finished the year with 52 tackles and four interceptions.

References

External links
Arkansas Razorbacks bio

Living people
Players of American football from Texas
American football cornerbacks
LSU Tigers football players
Arkansas Razorbacks football players